Dargahi Singh Bhati (d. 1828) was Gurjar king from Dadri .

'

Career 
He owned a fort at Parikshitgarh in Meerut District, also known as Qila Parikishatgarh.  At one point he possessed 277 villages purchased with his own funds.

During this era he ruled Noida, Greater Noida and  Ghaziabad.

References

1828 deaths
Year of birth missing